Y Records was a British independent record label set up in 1980 by Dick O'Dell in the United Kingdom, and distributed by Rough Trade.

History
Artists included the Slits, Shriekback and a number of groups that were associated with the Bristol indie band scene from the late 1970s: the Pop Group, Glaxo Babies, Maximum Joy and Pigbag.

The label's first release in 1980 ("Where There's a Will There's a Way" / "In the Beginning There Was Rhythm") was a split single by the Pop Group and the Slits, bands which shared a drummer (Bruce Smith) as well as manager (Dick O'Dell). Pigbag's single, "Papa's Got a Brand New Pigbag") entered the UK Indie Chart in May 1981, and stayed there for 70 weeks in total, peaking at No. 1.

Y Records were eventually incorporated into Kaz Records, part of Castle Communications. O'Dell later joined with William Orbit's progressive house music company, Guerilla Records, which became prominent in British progressive house music in the early 1990s, with acts such as Leftfield, Spooky, React to Rhythm and D.O.P.

Discography
 Y1: Pop Group/The Slits - "Where There's a Will"/"In the Beginning" 7" (co-released as Rough Trade RT039)
 Y2: Pop Group - For How Much Longer Do We Tolerate Mass Murder LP (co-released as Rough Trade ROUGH 9)
 Y3: Slits - Bootleg Retrospective LP (coverless authorized bootleg)
 Y4: Slits - "Man Next Door" 7" (co-released as Rough Trade RT044)
 Y5: Pop Group - We Are Time LP (co-released as Rough Trade ROUGH 12)
 Y6: Glaxo Babies - "Limited Entertainment"/"You Can Sell Your Soul for a Pot of Gold, 24 Hours a Day" 7"
 Y7: Slits - "Animal Space" 7" (co-released as Human Records HUM 4)
 Y8: Vincent Units - "Carnival Song"/"Everything Is Going to Be All Wrong" 7"/cassette
 Y9: Steve Beresford/Tristan Honsinger - Double Indemnity LP  
 Y10: Pigbag - "Papa's Got a Brand New Pigbag" 7"/12"  
 Y11: Maximum Joy - "Stretch"/"Silent Street" 7"/12"  
 Y12: Pigbag - "Sunny Day" 7"/12"  
 Y13: Tristan Honsinger/Steve Beresford/Toshinori Kondo/David Toop - "Imitation of Life" LP  
 Y14: Tesco Bombers - "Hernando’s Hideaway" 7"
 Y15: Maximum Joy - "White and Green Place" 7"/12"  
 Y16: Pigbag - "Getting Up" 7"/12"  
 Y17: Pigbag - Dr. Heckle & Mr. Jive LP  
 Y18: Diamanda Galas - The Litanies of Satan LP  
 Y19: Sun Ra - Stange Celestial Road LP  
 Y20: Mouth - "Who's Hot" 7"/10" with double groove featuring different versions of the song
 Y21: Shriekback - Tench MLP  
 Y22: Shriekback - "Sexthinkone" 7"  
 Y23: Christopher Reeves - "Dining at Dzerzhinsky's" 7"/12"  
 Y24: Pigbag - "The Big Bean" 7"/12"  
 Y25: Pulsallama - "The Devil Lives in My Husband's Body"/"Ungawa Pt. II" 7"/12" double A-side single
 Y26: Maximum Joy - "In the Air" 7"/12"  
 Y27: Shriekback - "My Spine Is the Baseline" 7"/12"  
 Y28: Maximum Joy - Station MXJY LP  
 Y29: Tymon Dogg - Battle of Wills LP  
 Y30: R.A.P.P featuring Archie Pool - R.A.P.P. Presents Wicked City featuring Archie Pool LP  
 Y31: The Promenaders - The Promenaders LP  
 Y32: Disconnection - "Bali Ha'i" 12"  
 Y33⅓: Various - Birth of the Y LP  
 Y LP 501: Pigbag - Lend an Ear LP  
 Y LP 502: Shriekback - Care LP          
 Y LP 504: Shriekback - Jam Science LP (not authorized by the band)
 Y MP 1001: Pigbag - Live MLP  
 Y PB 100: Pigbag - Favourite Things compilation LP
 Y RA 1: Sun Ra Arkestra - "Nuclear War"/"Sometimes I'm Happy" 12"  
 Y RA 2: Sun Ra Arkestra - Nuclear War LP (released in Italy)
 Y(T)101: Pigbag - "Hit the O'Deck" 7"/12"  
 Y(T)102: Shriekback - "Lined Up" 7"/12"  
 YT103: Pulsallama - "Qui Qui (A Canadian in Paris)" 12"
 Y(T)104: Shriekback - "Working on the Ground" 7"/12"  
 Y(T)106: Shriekback - "Lined Up"/"My Spine" 7"/12"/12" picture disc

See also
 List of record labels
 The Slits
 Shriekback
 The Pop Group
 Glaxo Babies
 Maximum Joy
 Pigbag
 99 Records
 List of bands from Bristol

References

External links
[ Dick O'Dell at AllMusic]
The Y Records Discography at Discogs
Dick O'Dell Discography at Discogs
Dick O'Dell's official Myspace

Record labels established in 1980
British independent record labels
Indie rock record labels
Post-punk record labels